In organic chemistry, quinoids are a class of chemical compounds that are derived from quinone. Unlike benzenoid structures, the quinoid part is not aromatic.

See also 
 Benzenoid
 Aromatic compound

References

Cyclic compounds